The Philippines has produced nine cardinals.

The population of Catholics in the Philippines constitutes the country's largest religious denomination, as well as one of the largest Catholic populations among countries of the world.  The Catholic faith was introduced to the Philippines by Spanish colonists in the sixteenth century. Some 400 years later, in 1960, Rufino J. Santos, the Archbishop of Manila, became the first Filipino cardinal.  Since then, a total of nine Filipinos have been raised to the rank of cardinal.

On May 1, 2020, Luis Antonio G. Tagle, Prefect of the Congregation for the Evangelization of Peoples, was promoted to the rank of cardinal-bishop. He is the first Filipino to hold the highest rank of a cardinal in the Catholic Church.

Currently there are two active Filipino cardinals, Luis Antonio G. Tagle, current Prefect of the Congregation for the Evangelization of Peoples and Jose F. Advincula, current Archbishop of Manila.

List of Filipino Cardinals

Number living

See also
 List of Roman Catholic dioceses in the Philippines
 Catholic Church hierarchy
 Catholic Church in the Philippines

References

Filipino Roman Catholics
Philippines